The Fairchild Model 45 was a 1930s American five-seat cabin monoplane aircraft designed and built by Fairchild.

Development
During 1934 the Fairchild company designed a business or executive aircraft with five seats, designated the Model 45. It first flew on 31 May 1935. The Model 45 was a low-wing cantilever monoplane with a conventional cantilever tail unit and a retractable tailwheel landing gear. The aircraft was powered by a 225 hp (168 kW) Jacobs L-4 radial engine and had a luxury five-seat interior as standard. Flight testing showed that the aircraft performed well, although it was described as sedate.

The company predicted that the Model 45 would have only limited market appeal in that form, therefore only the prototype was built.

Fairchild then upgraded the prototype with a larger engine, the Wright R-760 radial, for evaluation.  In this configuration it was designated the Model 45-A.  This configuration was placed in production, with about 16 units being completed.

Operational history

One aircraft was bought as an executive transport by the United States Navy as the JK-1. After the United States entered the Second World War, two aircraft were impressed into service with the United States Army Air Forces as the UC-88.

In 1997, Greg Herrick requested drawings of a Fairchild 45 tail section for an ongoing restoration project. The request was refused, citing the design was a trade secret. This led to a FOIA request, and lawsuit that was debated in the United States Supreme Court. The effort led to the "Herrick amendment" added to the FAA Air Transportation Modernization and Safety Improvement Act of 2012. The amendment released the ATC type certificate information for 1,257 aircraft first certified in 1927 through the beginning of World War II in 1939.

Variants
45
One prototype powered by a 225 hp (168 kW) Jacobs L-4 radial engine.
45-A
Production aircraft powered by a 320 hp (239 kW) Wright R-760 radial engine, 16 built.
JK-1
One 45-A for the United States Navy.
UC-88
Two 45-As impressed into service with the United States Army Air Forces.

Operators
USA
United States Army Air Forces
United States Navy

Specifications (45-A)

See also

References

Citations

Bibliography
The Illustrated Encyclopedia of Aircraft (Part Work 1982-1985), 1985, Orbis Publishing

External links

Flight, 17 October 1935 (dead link)

1930s United States civil utility aircraft
1930s United States military transport aircraft
Low-wing aircraft
Single-engined tractor aircraft
45
Aircraft first flown in 1935